Roses in Autumn (German: Rosen im Herbst) is a 1955 West German historical drama film directed by Rudolf Jugert and starring Ruth Leuwerik, Bernhard Wicki, Carl Raddatz and Lil Dagover. It is based on the 1894 novel Effi Briest by Theodor Fontane.  It was shot in Eastmancolor at the Bavaria Studios in Munich. The film's sets were designed by the art director Walter Haag and Hans Kutzner. Location shooting took place around Göttingen in Lower Saxony and the island of Sylt in Schleswig-Holstein.

Cast
 Ruth Leuwerik as Effi Briest
 Bernhard Wicki as 	Geert von Innstetten
 Paul Hartmann as Mr. von Briest
 Carl Raddatz as 	Major von Crampas
 Lil Dagover as 	Mrs. von Briest
 Lotte Brackebusch as 	Roswitha - Kindermädchen
 Günther Lüders as 	Alonzo Gieshübler
 Margot Trooger as Johanna - Haushälterin
 Heinz Hilpert as 	Minister von Cramer
 Eva Vaitl as 	Mrs. von Cramer
 Lola Müthel as 	Marietta Tripelli
 Hans Cossy as 	Mr. von Wüllersdorf
 Hedwig Wangel as Konsulin Rhode
 Willem Holsboer as 	Reverend Lindequist
 Maria Krahn as 	Mrs. Lindequist
 Barbara Born as 	Anni von Innstetten
 Gundel Thormann as 	Sidonie von Grasenabb
 Antoinette von Kitzing as 	Mädchen
 Hans-Jürgen von Kitzing as 	Kutscher

References

Bibliography
 Bock, Hans-Michael & Bergfelder, Tim. The Concise CineGraph. Encyclopedia of German Cinema. Berghahn Books, 2009.
 Goble, Alan. The Complete Index to Literary Sources in Film. Walter de Gruyter, 1999.
 Peucker, Brigitte. A Companion to Rainer Werner Fassbinder. John Wiley & Sons, 2012.

External links 
 

1955 films
1955 drama films
German drama films
West German films
1950s German-language films
Films directed by Rudolf Jugert
1950s German films
Remakes of German films
Films based on German novels
Gloria Film films
Films shot at Bavaria Studios
German historical films
1950s historical films
Films set in the 1890s

de:Rosen im Herbst